John M. Reid is a Scottish retired football outside right who played in the Scottish League for Queen's Park. He was capped by Scotland at amateur level.

References 

Scottish footballers
Scottish Football League players
Queen's Park F.C. players
Association football outside forwards
Scotland amateur international footballers
Place of birth missing (living people)
Year of birth missing (living people)
Dunfermline Athletic F.C. players
Living people